Shane Webb (born 14 September 1980) is an Australian footballer who plays for Marconi Stallions.

References

1980 births
Living people
Australian soccer players
A-League Men players
National Soccer League (Australia) players
Sydney United 58 FC players
Marconi Stallions FC players
Newcastle Jets FC players
Bankstown City FC players
Bonnyrigg White Eagles FC players
Association football defenders
National Premier Leagues players
Mounties Wanderers FC players
Soccer players from Melbourne